Aboa may refer to:

 Turku
 Aboa (research station)
 Aboa Vetus & Ars Nova